The Teegarden-Centennial Covered Bridge is a covered bridge in Columbiana County, Ohio. The bridge crosses Little Beaver Creek on Eagleton Road, 0.1 miles East of county road 411 near Salem, Ohio. It is currently only open to pedestrian traffic.

It was named after U. Teegarden who owned land near the bridge. Also known as the Centennial Bridge, it was built in 1876, 100 years after the signing of the United States Declaration of Independence.

The 66-foot, multiple king post span was designed by Jeremiah C. Mountz and David Reese. The bridge was in use until 1992 and underwent restoration in 2003. It was added to the National Register of Historic Places in August 2010.

References

External links

Covered bridges on the National Register of Historic Places in Ohio
Bridges completed in 1875
Buildings and structures in Columbiana County, Ohio
National Register of Historic Places in Columbiana County, Ohio
Road bridges on the National Register of Historic Places in Ohio
Wooden bridges in Ohio
1875 establishments in Ohio